Keep Your Courage is the upcoming eighth studio album by American singer-songwriter Natalie Merchant, due to be released on April 14, 2023 by Nonesuch Records. It is her first full-length studio album since 2014's Natalie Merchant and was promoted prior to release with the single "Come On, Aphrodite" on February 15, 2023. Merchant also promoted the release with a tour, accompanied on some dates by a symphony orchestra.

Track listing
All songs written by Natalie Merchant, except where noted
"Big Girls"
"Come On, Aphrodite" – 5:21
"Sister Tilly"
"Narcissus"
"Hunting the Wren" (Ian Lynch)
"Guardian Angel"
"Eye of the Storm"
"Tower of Babel"
"Song of Himself"
"The Feat of Saint Valentine"
Vinyl edition bonus tracks
"Spring & Fall: To a Young Child" – 3:03 (from Leave Your Sleep, 2010)
"Butterfly" – 5:39 (from Butterfly, 2017)
"Giving Up Everything" – 4:20 (from Natalie Merchant, 2014)
"Frozen Charlotte" – 5:58 (from Butterfly, 2017)

Personnel
Natalie Merchant – vocals, production, liner notes
Kinan Azmeh – clarinet
Stephen Barber – conducting
Steve Davis – trombone
Megan Gould – conducting
Colin Jacobsen – conducting
Gabriel Kahane – conducting
Abena Koomson-Davis – vocals on "Come On, Aphrodite"
Lúnasa
Ed Boyd – guitar
Kevin Crawford – flutes, whistles
Patrick Doocey – guitar
Colin Farrell – fiddle, whistles
Trevor Hutchinson – double bass
Seán Smyth – fiddle, whistles
Cillian Vallely – Uilleann pipes, whistles

See also
List of 2023 albums

References

External links

2023 albums
Natalie Merchant albums
Upcoming albums
Nonesuch Records albums